Nathan James Peel (born 17 May 1972) is an English former professional footballer who played as a striker.

References

1972 births
Living people
Footballers from Preston, Lancashire
English footballers
Association football forwards
Preston North End F.C. players
Sheffield United F.C. players
Halifax Town A.F.C. players
Burnley F.C. players
Rotherham United F.C. players
Mansfield Town F.C. players
Doncaster Rovers F.C. players
Macclesfield Town F.C. players
Winsford United F.C. players
Stevenage F.C. players
Northwich Victoria F.C. players
Droylsden F.C. players
Barrow A.F.C. players
English Football League players
Clitheroe F.C. players